The 1938 Texas gubernatorial election was held on November 8, 1938.

Democratic politician W. Lee O'Daniel defeated Republican nominee Alexander Boynton with 96.84% of the vote.

Nominations

Democratic primary
The Democratic primary election was won by O'Daniel by winning over 50% of the vote, and subsequently avoided a run-off.

Candidates
S.T. Brogdon
Carl A. Crowley
Clarence E. Farmer
James A. Ferguson
Tom F. Hunter
Joseph King
Marvin P. McCoy
William McCraw, Attorney General of Texas from 1935 – 1939
Clarence R. Miller
W. Lee O'Daniel
P.D. Renfro
Thomas Self
Ernest O. Thompson, incumbent Railroad Commissioner

Results

Republican nomination

The Republican state convention was held at Houston on August 9, 1938. Alexander Boynton, Houston oilman, was nominated for Governor.

General election

Candidates
W. Lee O'Daniel, Democratic
Alexander Boynton, Republican
Earl E. Miller, Socialist
Homer Brooks, Communist

Results

References

Bibliography
 
 

1938
Texas
Gubernatorial
November 1938 events